Shyamal Gangapadhyay (25 March 1933 – 24 September 2001) was a Bengali novelist and editor. He received Sahitya Academy Award in 1993 for the novel of Shahjada Darasukoh, based on the life of Mughal Emperor Dara Shukoh.

Early life
Gangapadhyay was born in Khulna, British India. His father name was Matilal Gangapadhyay and mother Kiranmoyee Devi. After the partition of 1947 their family came to India. Gangapadhyay was attracted towards student politics while studying in college. In the meanwhile he worked in a Steel factory in Belur. After completion of graduation in 1956, he also worked as teacher for few days in Mathuranath Bidyapith.

Literary career
In 1960, Gangapadhyay started his journalist career in Anandabazar Patrika. Number of short stories were published in Anandabazar. His first novel Brihannala which was published as Arjuner Aggatobas and mostly admired novel Kubere Bishoy Ashoy in Desh. After 16 years of continuous service he left ABP house due to sudden confrontation with senior editor Santosh Kumar Ghosh and joined in Jugantar Patrika in 1976. He edited literary magazine Amrita. His epic novel Shahjada Darasukoh was published in Saptahik (Weekly) Bartaman Magazine, which was awarded Sahitya Academy in 1993. After retirement Gangapadhyay joined in Aajkaal daily magazine. His last novel was Ganga Ekti Nadir Naam. He wrote series of story of Sadhu Kalachand which is popular for teens. His novels were translated and published in various languages. He won Bibhutibhushan memorial award in recognition of his contribution to the Bengali literature and Gajendra Kumar Mitra memorial prize, Sarat Purashkar in 2000.

Works
 Kuberer Bisoy Ashoy
 Shahjada Darasukoh (Vol I & II)
 Iswaritala Roopkatha
 Hawa Gari
 Swarther Ager Station
 Sadhu Kalachand Samagra (Vol I & II)
 Benche Thakar Swad
 Class 7er Mr. Bleck
 Alo Nei
 Jiban Rahassyo
 Jatin Darogar Betanto
 Valobasibona Ar
 Sudhamoyeer Dinlipi
 Durbiner Ultodike
 Vasco Da Gamar Vaipo
 Gatojanmer Rastai
 Amaltas
 Ganga Ekti Nadir Naam

Death 
Gangapadhyay was suffering from Brain Cancer and died at the age of 68 in Kolkata on 24 September 2001.

References

Bengali-language writers
1933 births
2001 deaths
Bengali Hindus
Bengali writers
20th-century Bengalis
Recipients of the Sahitya Akademi Award in Bengali
Indian novelists
Indian male novelists
20th-century Indian novelists
Indian historical novelists
Writers from Kolkata
Bengali novelists
Indian editors
Indian magazine editors
University of Calcutta alumni
People from Khulna
Novelists from West Bengal
Indian writers
20th-century Indian writers
Indian male writers
20th-century Indian male writers
Indian short story writers
Indian male short story writers
Indian journalists
20th-century Indian journalists
Indian male journalists
20th-century Indian short story writers